Acer oblongum, common name Himalayan maple, evergreen maple and Kashmir maple, is an evergreen Asian species of maple in the family Sapindaceae.

Description

Unique among maples, this plant stays green all winter. The trunks are buttressed, with a smooth to wrinkled bark. Leaves are opposite, ovate-lanceolate with entire margin, with a petiole 5–12 cm long, with  glaucous-green underside and dark green upperside. The young shoots are reddish bronze and finely hairy. The flowers are hermaphroditic, small and inconspicuous, about 4 mm, greenish white, gathered in hairy racemes. The fruits are represented by the typical two-winged samaras, about 2.5 cm long, wind dispersed. It has been introduced for its wood and it is sometimes cultivated in large gardens for its evergreen foliage.

Distribution
Acer oblongum is widespread across central, eastern, and southeastern Asia, from Tibet and northern India east as far as Japan, including southern China, and northern Indochina.

Habitat

References

External links
 
 Oregon State University
 Dipbot, Hortus Botanicus Catinensis, Botanical Department - University of Catania photo
 

oblongum
Trees of China
Trees of the Indian subcontinent
Trees of Indo-China
Plants described in 1824